Martin Simpson (20 November 1800 – 20 December 1892) was a British geologist working in the Whitby area of North Yorkshire, England.

His major publications were:
 A Monograph of the Ammonites of the Yorkshire Lias, 1843
  The Fossils of the Yorkshire Lias, 1855
 A Guide to the Geology of the Yorkshire Coast, 1856

References

1800 births
1892 deaths
British geologists